Swing Street is the twelfth studio album by composer and singer Barry Manilow, released in 1987. Three of the tracks on the album featured Manilow in a duet with another singer. The tracks were recorded at various locations. This album marks Manilow's return to the Arista Records label from RCA Records, where he had two releases from 1985 to 1986 including Manilow and the Soundtrack "Copacabana". The title of the album refers to 52nd Street in Manhattan, between 5th and 6th Avenues, which was the jazz mecca during the late 1930s and early 1940s.

Track listing

Side 1 - 8:00pm
"Swing Street" (Eddie Arkin, Barry Manilow, Roy Freeland) - 3:33
"Big Fun" (with Full Swing) (Arkin, Lorraine Feather) - 3:54
"Stompin' at the Savoy" (Benny Goodman, Chick Webb, Edgar Sampson, Andy Razaf, Manilow) - 2:40
"Black and Blue" (with Phyllis Hyman & Tom Scott) (Manilow, Tom Kelly, Adrienne Anderson) - 4:01
"Hey Mambo" (with Kid Creole and the Coconuts) (Manilow, Kelly, Bruce Sussman, Jack Feldman) - 2:52

Side 2 - Midnight
"Summertime" (with Diane Schuur & Stan Getz) (George Gershwin, DuBose Heyward) - 4:14
"Brooklyn Blues" (with Tom Scott) (Manilow, Sussman, Feldman) - 5:07
"Stardust" (with Uncle Festive) (Hoagy Carmichael, Mitchell Parish) - 5:19
"Once When You Were Mine" (Manilow, Anderson) - 2:49
"One More Time" (with Gerry Mulligan) (Manilow, Kelly, Sussman, Feldman) - 4:10

References

Barry Manilow albums
1987 albums
Arista Records albums